Murder Construct is an American extreme metal band from Los Angeles, California, United States. The band members are Travis Ryan (Cattle Decapitation), Leon del Muerte (Nausea LA, ex-Exhumed, ex-D.I.S., ex-Intronaut, ex-Impaled, ex-Phobia), Chris McCarthy (Exhausted Prater, Dreaming Dead), Caleb Schneider (Bad Acid Trip) and Danny Walker (ex-Intronaut, Exhumed, ex-Jesu, ex-Uphill Battle). Previous band members include drummer Jeremy Gregg.

History
Murder Construct was formed in 2001 following Leon del Muerte's departure from Impaled. The band then went through several line-up changes and subsequently the band went on hiatus while del Muerte rejoined Exhumed, and later Phobia and Intronaut.

The band was re-formed in August 2006, when del Muerte left Intronaut. The band then recorded a self-titled 7-song EP. On March 27, 2010, the band played its first show. In August 2010, the band signed with Relapse Records. The band toured with Kill the Client and Venomous Concept in September 2010. In November 2010, Relapse Records released their self-titled EP.

In June 2012, Relapse Records announced the debut album cover and title, Results. The album was released on August 28, 2012. In February 2013, the band parted ways with Kevin Fetus, and were joined by new guitarist Chris McCarthy. Murder Construct then tracked a Disrupt cover for a tribute to Disrupt, which was released on Power It Up Records.

Members

Current members
Travis Ryan – vocals
Leon del Muerte – vocals, guitar
Chris McCarthy – guitar
Caleb Schneider – bass guitar
Danny Walker – drums

Past members
Kevin Fetus – guitar
Jeremy Gregg – drums

Discography
 Murder Construct EP (2010)
 Results (2012)

References

External links
Band Site
Facebook Profile
Terrorizer Interview
Relapse Records page

Death metal musical groups from California
Deathgrind musical groups
Political music groups
Musical groups from Los Angeles